Tyrrell Downs is a locality in the northern part of the Shire of Buloke, Victoria, Australia. The post office there opened in April 1898 and was closed on 1 July 1927.

References